Largus cinctus is a species of bordered plant bug in the family Largidae. It is found in Central America, North America, and South America.

References

External links

 

Largidae
Articles created by Qbugbot
Insects described in 1842